Haoua Yao (born 2 July 1979), sportingly known in Burkina Faso as Farota, is a former footballer who played as a goalkeeper. Born and raised in Burkina Faso, she was naturalized by Equatorial Guinea to play for their women's national team, and was squad member for three Africa Women Cup of Nations editions (2006, 2008 and 2010) and 2011 FIFA Women's World Cup.

Club career
Yao has played for Princesses, Gazelles and Sirènes du Kadiogo in Burkina Faso.

Honours
Equatorial Guinea
Africa Women Cup of Nations: Winner in 2008 and runner-up in 2010

References

External links

1979 births
Living people
Place of birth missing (living people)
Burkinabé women's footballers
Women's association football goalkeepers
Equatorial Guinea women's international footballers
2011 FIFA Women's World Cup players
Equatoguinean women's footballers
21st-century Burkinabé people